Breeze TV was a New Zealand music streaming channel that was launched by The Breeze radio station on 16 April 2020 as a replacement for MediaWorks New Zealand's former ThreeLife + 1 on channel 14. Breeze TV was launched alongside sister channel The Edge TV, which replaced ThreeLife on channel 11. On 1 December 2020, Discovery, Inc. acquired Breeze TV as part of its acquisition of MediaWorks' television operations. On 21 March 2022, Breeze TV became an exclusively online streaming channel, alongside sister channel The Edge TV. In December 2022, Breeze TV and The Edge TV ceased broadcasting.

Notes and references

External links

Television channels in New Zealand
Television channels and stations established in 2020
English-language television stations in New Zealand
2020 establishments in New Zealand